Joseph Sulkowski (Józef Sułkowski, c. 1770, Palatinate of Poznań – 22 October 1798, Cairo, Egypt) was a Polish captain in the French Revolutionary Army and friend and aide de camp to Napoleon Bonaparte. He also became friends with Muiron, Vivant Denon, Lazare Carnot, Augereau, and Bourienne. His name is engraved on the Arc de Triomphe, on the 28th column, as SULKOSKY.

Life

Italy
A fine strategist, he played an important role in the first Italian campaign. It was his bravery that led to the capture of the Saint-George batteries. He was wounded at the battle of Arcole.

Egypt
He died in the revolt of Cairo on 22 October 1798, suffering from wounds received a few weeks earlier, and his body was given to the dogs. On hearing of his death Bonaparte showed remorse and, asked why he did not honour him more when he was alive, replied "On first meeting him, I saw in him a commander in chief". Dying too young, Carnot would have seen in him a potential replacement for the future emperor. Shortly before his death, he married one of the daughters of Venture de Paradis, an old military interpreter on the Egyptian expedition.

1770 births
1798 deaths
Polish military personnel
Kościuszko insurgents
People of the Polish–Russian War of 1792
French military personnel of the French Revolutionary Wars
French Republican military leaders killed in the French Revolutionary Wars
Recipients of the Virtuti Militari
Joseph
Names inscribed under the Arc de Triomphe